Roots 'N Blues: The Retrospective 1925-1950 is a four-CD box set released on Columbia Records in June 1992. The collection features about five hours of early blues, folk/country and gospel recordings from a variety of American artists. Many of these recordings had never previously been issued in any medium. The liner notes were written by Lawrence Cohn and Pete Welding.

Track listing

Disc one
Charlie Poole with the North Carolina Ramblers - "Whitehouse Blues" (3:25) (recorded September 20, 1926, in New York City, New York)
Aiken Country String Band - "High Sheriff" (2:53) (recorded September 19, 1927, in Winston-Salem, North Carolina)
Frank Hutchison - "The Last Scene of the Titanic" (3:30) (recorded April 29, 1927, in St. Louis, Missouri)
Hersal Thomas - "Suitcase Blues" (2:36) (recorded c. February 22, 1925, in Chicago, Illinois)
The Reverend J.M. Gates - "Death's Black Train is Coming" (3:11) (recorded April 24, 1926, in Atlanta, Georgia)
Dora Carr - "Cow Cow Blues" (2:50) (recorded October 1, 1925, in New York City, New York)
Vance's Tennessee Breakdowners - "Washington County Fox Chase" (2:57) (recorded September 22, 1927, in Winston-Salem, North Carolina)
Fiddlin' John Carson - "I'm Going to Take the Train to Charlotte" (3:05) (recorded August 10, 1928, in Atlanta, Georgia)
Ernest V. Stoneman's Trio - Untitled (3:01) (recorded January 1, 1927, in New York City, New York)Whistler and His Jug Band - "Low Down Blues" (2:56) (recorded April 29, 1927, in St. Louis, Missouri)Washington Phillips - "Paul and Silas in Jail" (2:42) (recorded December 2, 1927, in Dallas, Texas) 
Barbecue Bob - "Blind Pig Blues" (3:02) (recorded April 13, 1928, in Atlanta, Georgia)Austin and Lee Allen - "Chattanooga Blues" (3:04) (recorded November 4, 1927, in Atlanta, Georgia)Sherman Tedder - Untitled (2:57) (recorded February 25, 1928, in Memphis, Tennessee)Dallas String Band with Coley Jones - "Hokum Blues" (3:25) (recorded December 8, 1928, in Dallas, Texas)Gladys Bentley - "Worried Blues" (2:45) (recorded August 8, 1928, in New York City, New York)Elizabeth Johnson - "Empty Bed Blues, Part One" (3:02) (recorded June 26, 1928, in New York City, New York)Elizabeth Johnson - "Empty Bed Blues, Part Two" (3:22) (recorded June 26, 1928, in New York City, New York)South Georgia Highballers - "Blue Grass Twist" (2:48) (recorded October 5, 1927, in Atlanta, Georgia)Charlie Bowman and His Brothers - "Moonshiner and His Money" (3:10) (recorded February 20, 1929, in New York City, New York)Clarence Horton Greene - "Johnson City Blues" (2:57) (recorded October 15, 1928, in Johnson City, Tennessee)The Reverend Johnny Blakey, assisted by the Sanctified Singers - "Warming By The Devil's Fire" (3:25) (recorded December 6, 1928, in Chicago, Illinois)Papa Too Sweet & Harry Jones - "(Honey) It's Tight Like That" (2:36) (recorded December 11, 1928, in Chicago, Illinois)Mississippi John Hurt - "Big Leg Blues" (2:51) (recorded December 21, 1928, in New York City, New York)Daniels-Deason Sacred Harp Singers - "Hallelujah" (2:58) (recorded October 24, 1928, in Atlanta, Georgia)Disc two

Herschel Brown and His Happy Five - "Liberty" (2:54) (recorded March 19, 1929, in Atlanta, Georgia)Mamie Smith - "My Sportin' Man" (2:58) (recorded March 30, 1929, in New York City, New York)Blues Birdhead - "Mean Low Blues" (3:13) (recorded October 13, 1929, in Richmond, Virginia)Pink Anderson and Simmie Dooley - "C.C. & O. Blues" (3:05) (recorded April 14, 1928, in Atlanta, Georgia)The OKeh Atlanta Sacred Harp Singers - "Ortonville" (3:11) (recorded March 18, 1929, in Atlanta, Georgia)Slim Doucet - "Dear Black Eyes (Chere Yeux Noirs)" (3:00) (recorded March 20, 1929, in Atlanta, Georgia)Roosevelt Sykes - "Roosevelt Blues" (2:47) (recorded November 16, 1929, in Chicago, Illinois)The Hokum Boys - "Gin Mill Blues" (3:27) (recorded November 16, 1929, in Chicago, Illinois)Joe Falcon, accompanied by Clemo and Ophy Breaux - "Osson" (2:56) (recorded April 18, 1929, in Atlanta, Georgia)W.T. Narmour & S.W. Smith - "Sweet Milk and Peaches (Breakdown)" (3:11) (recorded September 25, 1929, in New York City, New York)Gid Tanner and the Skillet Lickers, with Riley Puckett & Clayton McMichen - "Soldier's Joy" (2:54) (recorded October 29, 1929, in Atlanta, Georgia)Whistlin' Alex Moore - "They May Not Be My Toes" (3:02) (recorded December 5, 1929, in Dallas, Texas)Mississippi Sheiks - "The Jazz Fiddler" (3:13) (recorded February 17, 1930, in Shreveport, Louisiana)Lonnie Johnson - "I Have To Do My Time" (3:09) (recorded August 5, 1930, in New York City, New York)Tom Darby and Jimmie Tarlton - "Lonesome Frisco Line" (3:17) (recorded October 31, 1929, in Atlanta, Georgia)Roy Harvey and Leonard Copeland - "Back to the Blue Ridge" (2:55) (recorded June 30, 1930, in Atlanta, Georgia)Buster Carter and Preston Young - "Darn Good Girl" (2:51) (recorded June 26, 1931, in New York City, New York)Bo Carter - "West Jackson Blues" (3:17) (recorded June 10, 1930, in San Antonio, Texas)Lonnie Johnson and Clara Smith (as Violet Green) - "You Had Too Much" (3:19) (recorded October 31, 1930, in New York City, New York)Silver Leaf Quartet - "Oh! Glory Glory" (3:13) (recorded March 20, 1931, in New York City, New York)Freeny's Barn Dance Band - "Don't You Remember the Time" (3:16) (recorded December 16, 1930, in Jackson, Mississippi)Pelican Wildcats - "Walkin' Georgia Blues" (2:56) (recorded October 27, 1931, in Atlanta, Georgia)Peetie Wheatstraw (The Devil's Son-in-Law) - "Police Station Blues" (3:03) (recorded March 15, 1932, in New York City, New York)Tindley Quaker City Gospel Singers - "Hallelujah Side" (3:16) (recorded March 8, 1932, in New York City, New York)Will Batts - "Highway #61 Blues" (2:42) (recorded August 3, 1933, in New York City, New York)Disc three
W. Lee O'Daniel and His Light Crust Doughboys - "Doughboys Theme Song #1" (0:41) (recorded c. April 1934 in San Antonio, Texas)W. Lee O'Daniel and His Hillbilly Boys - "Ida (Sweet as Apple Cider)" (3:09) (recorded November 21, 1936, in San Antonio, Texas)W. Lee O'Daniel and His Light Crust Doughboys - "Doughboys Theme Song #2" (0:29) (recorded c. April 1934 in San Antonio, Texas)Blind Willie McTell & Partner - "Bell Street Lightnin'" (2:52) (recorded September 21, 1933, in New York City, New York)Charlie Patton - "Jersey Bull Blues" (3:04) (recorded January 30, 1934, in New York City, New York)Walter Roland - "Every Morning Blues" (2:44) (recorded August 2, 1934, in New York City, New York)Blue Ridge Ramblers - "D Blues" (2:48) (recorded February 14, 1935, in New York City, New York)Breaux Freres - "La valse des yeux bleu (Blue Eyes Waltz)" (3:11) (recorded October 9, 1934, in San Antonio, Texas)Lucille Bogan (as Bessie Jackson) - "Skin Game Blues" (2:57) (recorded March 8, 1935, in New York City, New York)Leroy Carr with Scrapper Blackwell - "Good Woman Blues" (2:57) (recorded December 14, 1934, in New York City, New York)Josh White (as Pinewood Tom) - "Sissy Man" (2:49) (recorded March 18, 1935, in New York City, New York)The Rhythm Wreckers - "Blue Yodel #2 (My Lovin' Gal Lucille)" (2:46) (recorded March 27, 1937, in Los Angeles, California)The Anglin Twins (Jack and Jim) - "Just Inside The Pearly Gates" (2:25) (recorded November 5, 1937, in San Antonio, Texas)Bumble Bee Slim (Amos Easton) - "Hard Rocks in My Bed" (2:40) (recorded February 6, 1936, in Chicago, Illinois)The Two Charlies - "Tired Feelin' Blues" (3:03) (recorded April 10, 1936, in New York City, New York)Eldon Baker with His Brown County Revellers - "One Eyed Sam" (2:51) (recorded June 5, 1938, in Chicago, Illinois)A'nt Idy Harper with The Coon Creek Girls - "Poor Naomi Wise" (3:36) (recorded June 30, 1938, in Chicago, Illinois)(Kid) Prince Moore - "South Bound Blues" (3:01) (recorded April 10, 1936, in New York City, New York)Big Bill Broonzy - "C & A Blues" (2:58) (recorded June 20, 1935, in Chicago, Illinois)George Curry - "My Last Five Dollars" (2:36) (recorded November 2, 1938, in Chicago, Illinois)The Nite Owls - "Memphis Blues" (2:21) (recorded June 12, 1938, in Dallas, Texas)The Alley Boys of Abbeville - "Pourquoi tu m'aime pas" (3:46) (recorded June 30, 1939, in Memphis, Tennessee)Reverend Benny Campbell - "Have Mercy on Me" (2:32) (recorded November 8, 1938, in Columbia, South Carolina)Albert Ammons - "Shout For Joy" (2:25) (recorded December 30, 1938, in New York City, New York)Jack Kelly - "Flower Blues" (2:30) (recorded July 14, 1939, in Memphis, Tennessee)Cliff Carlisle (as Bob Clifford) - "Onion Eating Mama" (2:54) (recorded August 29, 1934, in New York City, New York)Callahan Bros. - "Brown's Ferry Blues #2" (3:06) (recorded April 11, 1935, in New York City, New York)Little Buddy Doyle - "Slick Capers Blues" (2:35) (recorded July 1, 1939, in Memphis, Tennessee)Bill "Jazz" Gillum (as Bill McKinley) - "Poor Boy Blues" (2:54) (recorded May 2, 1941, in Chicago, Illinois)Disc four
Frank Edwards - "We Got To Get Together" (2:36) (recorded May 28, 1941, in Chicago, Illinois)Sweet Violet Boys - "You Got To See Mama Ev'ry Night (Or You Can't See Mama At All)" (2:49) (recordcd February 15, 1940, in Chicago, Illinois)The Humbard Family - "I'll Fly Away" (2:49) (recorded April 17, 1940, in Dallas, Texas)Tony Hollins - "Cross Cut Saw Blues" (2:48) (recorded June 3, 1941, in Chicago, Illinois)Peter Cleighton - "Black Snake Blues" (2:51) (recorded July 1, 1941, in Chicago, Illinois)Black Cats and the Kitten - "Step It Up and Go" (2:48) (recorded October 21, 1940, in Chicago, Illinois)Bob and Randall Atcher - "Papa's Going Crazy, Mama's Going Mad" (2:38) (recorded June 13, 1940, in Chicago, Illinois)Adolf Hofner and His San Antonians - "Cotton-Eyed Joe" (2:29) (recorded February 28, 1941, in Dallas, Texas)Poor Boy Burke - "Old Vets Blues" (2:53) (recorded November 21, 1941, in Chicago, Illinois)Little Son Joe - "Black Rat Swing" (2:52) (recorded December 12, 1941, in Chicago, Illinois)Big Maceo Merriweather - "Macy Special" (2:42) (recorded February 19, 1945, in Chicago, Illinois)Light Crust Doughboys, with J.B. Brinkley - "It's Funny What Love Will Make You Do" (2:47) (recorded March 3, 1941, in Dallas, Texas)Hank Penny and His Radio Cowboys - "Army Blues" (2:36) (recorded June 29, 1941, in Charlotte, North Carolina)James (Beale Street) Clark - "Who But You" (2:38) (recorded October 24, 1945, in Chicago, Illinois)Homer Harris - "Tomorrow May Be Too Late" (3:05) (recorded September 27, 1946, in Chicago, Illinois)Muddy Waters (as McKinley Morganfield) - "Burying Ground Blues" (2:30) (recorded September 27, 1946, in Chicago, Illinois)Bill Monroe and His Blue Grass Boys - "Goodbye Old Pal" (2:23) (recorded February 13, 1945, in Nashville, Tennessee)Gene Autry - "Dixie Cannonball" (2:40) (recorded September 9, 1946, in Hollywood, California)Bill Landford and The Landfordaires - "Run On For A Long Time" (2:34) (recorded December 15, 1949, in Memphis, Tennessee)Big Joe Williams - "Baby, Please Don't Go" (2:57) (recorded July 22, 1947, in Chicago, Illinois)Sister Myrtle Fields accompanied by Austin McCoy Trio - "I"m Toiling" (2:43) (recorded January 7, 1950, in Hollywood, California)Willie (Boodle It) Right - "Two By Four Blues" (2:56) (recorded October 7, 1940, in Chicago, Illinois)Bailes Bros. - "You Can't Go Halfway (And Get In)" (2:46) (recorded December 21, 1947, location not listed)Molly O'Day and the Cumberland Mountain Folks - "Heaven's Radio" (2:49) (recorded June 20, 1950, in Nashville, Tennessee)Rosetta Howard - "Plow Hand Blues" (2:46) (recorded December 20, 1947, in Chicago, Illinois)Memphis Seven - "Grunt Meat Blues" (2:47) (recorded October 4, 1947, in Chicago, Illinois)Deep South Boys - "Until I Found The Lord" (2:25) (recorded December 20, 1947, in Nashville, Tennessee)Brother Porter and Brother Cook - "I Know My Jesus Won't Deny Me" (2:41) (recorded July 11, 1950, in New York City, New York)

References

1992 compilation albums
Blues compilation albums
Folk compilation albums
Country music compilation albums
Gospel compilation albums